Hellfire Corner was a junction in the Ypres Salient in the First World War. The main supplies for the British Army in this sector passed along the road from Ypres to Menin - the famous Menin Road. A section of the road was where the Sint-Jan-Zillebeke road and the Ypres-Roulers (Roeselare) railway (line 64) crossed the road. The German Army positions overlooked this spot and their guns were registered upon it so that movement through this junction was perilous, making it the most dangerous place in the sector.

References

External links
The Western Front Today - Hellfire Corner - as it is today
This Is The Story Of The Most Dangerous Corner In The World - detailed Australian footage of the corner then and now

World War I
Ypres Salient